The 193rd (Nova Scotia Highlanders) Battalion, CEF was a unit in the Canadian Expeditionary Force during the First World War.  Based in Truro, Nova Scotia, the unit began recruiting during the winter of 1915/16 throughout Nova Scotia, one Cyril Wetmore recruiting more than 100 men "from Parrsboro to Apple River."  After sailing to England in October 1916, the battalion was absorbed into the 17th Reserve Battalion on January 20, 1917.

The 193rd Battalion had one Officer Commanding: Lieutenant Colonel R. J. S. Langford, later commander of the Royal Canadian Regiment (1929-1935) and co-author of Corporal to Field Officer and Handbook of Canadian Military Law.

The battalion was perpetuated by The Nova Scotia Highlanders.

See also 
 Military history of Nova Scotia

References

 Meek, John F. Over the Top! The Canadian Infantry in the First World War. Orangeville, Ont.: The Author, 1971.

External links
 Blue Feather battalion by Q.M.S. Edgar E. Kelley,. O.R.C. 193RD Battalion

Battalions of the Canadian Expeditionary Force
Military units and formations of Nova Scotia
Nova Scotia Highlanders
North Nova Scotia Highlanders